Parat is a large flat plate used to mix the ingredients for making chapati mostly in India. The plate used is mostly made of brass or steel but cheaper version made of aluminum are also commonplace. Atta also called wheat flour which is the main ingredient for the mixture is mixed with water, oil or ghee and optional salt and is made in to a paste.

Indian food preparation utensils